Ikebe (written:  or ) is a Japanese surname. Notable people with the surname include:

, Japanese painter
, Japanese actor
, Japanese composer

See also
Ikebe Station, a railway station in Nara Prefecture, Japan

Japanese-language surnames